Schwäbisch Gmünd (until 1934: Gmünd; Swabian: Gmẽẽd or Gmend) is a city in the eastern part of the German state of Baden-Württemberg. With a population of around 60,000, the city is the second largest in the Ostalb district and the whole East Württemberg region after Aalen. The city is a Große Kreisstadt since 1956, i.e. a chief city under district administration; it was the administrative capital of its own rural district until the local government reorganisation on 1 January 1973.

There are some institutions of higher education in the city, most notably the Pädagogische Hochschule Schwäbisch Gmünd (University of Education Schwäbisch Gmünd) and the Landesgymnasium für Hochbegabte (State Highschool for gifted children).

Schwäbisch Gmünd was a self-ruling free imperial city from the 13th century until its annexation to Württemberg in 1802.

Geography

It marks the place where the Josefsbach (Waldstetter-bach) meets the River Rems. The municipal area comprises the localities (Ortschaften) of Bargau, Bettringen, Degenfeld, Großdeinbach, Herlikofen, Hussenhofen, Lindach, Rechberg, Rehnenhof-Wetzgau, Straßdorf, and Weiler.

History

From about AD 85, the Neckar-Odenwald line was part of the northern frontier of the Roman Empire. The Romans built the Limes Germanicus to secure this border; i.e., a line of fortifications at regular distances, which included a small castrum on the site of the present-day Schirenhof field in Schwäbisch Gmünd. A first major settlement in this area arose around the 2nd century AD, when Roman soldiers were deployed near the Upper Germanic limes. From 223 onward, the border lines were assaulted and taken by the Alemanni, who settled down in the areas abandoned by the Romans.

In the 8th century a counterfeit document in the name of Charlemagne, prepared at the Abbey of St Denis near Paris, mentioned a monastic cell called Gamundias built by Abbot Fulrad of St Denis. Whether or not this refers to Gmünd is uncertain. There are no archaeological indications of a cell of this type in Gmünd.

Gmünd was first mentioned in an 1162 deed issued at nearby Lorch Abbey, then under the rule of the Hohenstaufen emperor Frederick Barbarossa. The self-proclaimed Stauferstadt achieved the status of an Imperial City in 1268, which it held until 1802, when it was mediatised to the Electorate of Württemberg.

By the end of the 14th century, the name "Etzel castle" was used for the remains of the Roman fort, which had been built to protect the Neckar-Odenwald border of the Roman Empire. In a Baroque chronicle of the city of Schwäbisch Gmünd, written by the councillor Friedrich Vogt (1623–1674), the "Castle" was mentioned in ancient writings as "Etzel castle". Even at the time of Vogt, the Roman remains were cheaper than stones from quarry, and these were thus removed to the ground. Only parts of the moat would still be visible.

The demesne officer, wine expert and archaeologist :de:Carl Gok (1776–1849), a half brother of the poet Friedrich Hölderlin, suspected in 1847, that the alleged castle on the Schirenhof manor had probably once been a Roman fort. The first modern and scientific excavations took place under the guidance of retired army chief of staff of the Württemberg army, General Eduard von Kallee and by Major Heinrich Steimle in the years 1886 to 1888, i.e. before the Imperial Limes Commission (Reichslimeskommision) had been set up. The so-called Schirenhof Castrum is now part of the UNESCO World Heritage Site Limes Germanicus.

U.S. Army
In March 1955 the 6th Field Artillery Battery arrived from Fort Bragg, NC. This was an Honest John missile battery. A medical battalion and the 567th field artillery battalion (155 mm self-propelled) of the 9th Infantry Division were already there.

In 1957 The 2 Battalion 16thField Artillery, 4th Armored Division was stationed in Bismark Karserne from 1957 through 1962.

The 3d Battalion, 17th Field Artillery was stationed at Hardt Kaserne until late 1963. The unit's mission was reinforcing fire for the 7th Army Light and medium Artillery units. The 8", M-55 Howitzer (SP) was considered the most accurate weapon in the Army's arsenal.

From 1963 to November 1968, the United States Army's 56th Field Artillery Group, equipped with Pershing missiles, was headquartered at the Hardt Kaserne along with A and D batteries of the 4th Battalion, 41st Artillery. Headquarters & Headquarters Battery then moved down the hill to the Bismarck Kaserne in November 1968. Family housing and the commissary were across the street from the Hardt Kaserne and overlooked a hill above Bismarck Kaserne. There was a school for military dependents (Kindergarten through eighth grade) within walking distance of the family housing. Teachers at this school were credentialed U.S. educators employed by USAREUR (United States Army Europe). In the late 1950s and early 1960s, there were also two local civilians employed to teach the German language (Herr Geis) and German song and dance (Frau Knöpfle). The Hardt Kaserne, formerly Adolf Hitler Kaserne, which was finished in 1937 and used to train officers for the war, was later home to the 4th Battalion, then in 1972 reactivated as 1st battalion 41st Field Artillery, Headquarters, B, C and Service Batteries, Headquarters and Headquarters Battery 56th Field Artillery Brigade, and A Company, 55th Support Battalion. The brigade command had four additional support units: an aviation company, a signal battalion, an infantry battalion, and a forward support battalion. In 1986 the name of the brigade was changed to 56th Field Artillery Command (Pershing).

Spring 2016 storm
On some of the last days of May 2016, a major storm that hit parts of France and southwestern Germany resulted in extensive flooding and damage to Schwäbisch Gmünd and the death of two people in the city.

Notable structures

Schwäbisch Gmünd is home to many historically structures and buildings. These include fortifications and civic and religious buildings.

City hall
Sitting at the south end of the Markt Square there lies the city hall. Before becoming the city hall, the city hall was the Debler patrician house and was originally constructed by city architect Johann Michael Keller. In fact, Dominikus Debler, remembered for his work writing the city chronicle, spent his childhood there. However, in 1793 a fire destroyed much of the city between Kornhaus and the Klösterle, leaving city leadership concerned for the safety of the old city hall. The Old City Hall (Altes Rathaus) was a fachwerk structure reminiscent of Kornhaus that stood between the Marienbrünnen and the present-day city hall. Both the initial construction of the building and the conversion of the Debler patrician house into the city hall were undertaken by Johann Michael Keller. The Old City Hall was deconstructed in two weeks and the only remaining artifacts that can be found on the present-day city hall are two of the bells on the bell tower and the clock face.

The Holy Cross Minster

The Holy Cross Minster is the city's main Catholic church. It stands on the site of a former, much smaller romanesque church. It took about 500 years to be completed, though not consecutively. Initial construction began around 1325 under the leadership of an unknown master builder on what was left of the previous romanesque church, the towers of which were still standing. In 1497, the south tower fell onto the north tower, which knocked over the north tower after a bow connecting the two was removed and in 1515, all repair work was finished.

The Church of Saint John
Sitting on the southeast of the Markt Square (only 78 meters northeast of the city hall), there lies a late Romanesque and neo-Romanesque church called the Johanneskirche, or Church of Saint John, also a Catholic church. As the story of its founding goes, Agnes of Hohenstaufen was out hunting in the Remstal one day and she lost her wedding band. She vowed to have a church built at the site where it would be recovered. Later, the ring was found in the antlers of a fallen stag at the site where the church now sits, and accordingly, Agnes commissioned the construction of the church. A cannonball fired during the Thirty Years' War (1618-1648) remains visibly lodged in the apse of the church.

Institutions
The University of Maryland University College opened a four-year German campus on the Bismarck Kaserne in 1992, which closed in 2002 due to financial difficulties and a lack of students. Festival Europäische Kirchenmusik was established in 1989.

In 2004, the state of Baden-Württemberg opened the Landesgymnasium für Hochbegabte (State Grammar School for the Highly Gifted) in some of the renovated buildings of the Bismarck Kaserne.

One of the oldest universities in the city is the Hochschule für Gestaltung Schwäbisch Gmünd, a design school established in 1776.

The Pädagogische Hochschule Schwäbisch Gmünd, also known as the University of Education Schwäbisch Gmünd, was established in 1825 and is one of six universities in Baden-Württemberg that were established for the sole purpose of educating upcoming teachers.

The European Academy of Surface Technology (EAST) is a scientific and technological institute on surface finishing and electroplating has its headquarters in the city since 1989. EAST grants annually the Schwäbisch Gmünd Prize for young scientists since 2017, in honor to the local tradition of craftsmanship of precious metals.

Local industry

Since the 17th century, Schwäbisch Gmünd has been home to producers of gold and silver handicrafts. An almost forgotten craft was the so-called "Silberporzellan", "Metallporzellan" or "Silberbelagwaren". Today it is known as Silver overlay and Schwäbisch Gmünd was home of inventor Friedrich Deusch who began to decorate not only porcelain but also glass with this unique technique in the end of 19th century. All the important items which are dealt on the art market today are originated in Schwäbisch Gmünd. The city is also home to the Forschungsinstitut für Edelmetalle und Metallchemie, an institute for precious metal work and surface technology. 

Other important industries include automotive suppliers like the steering division of Robert Bosch GmbH, manufacturers of machinery and glass, and a large subsidiary of the Swiss toiletries and medicine producer Weleda.

Schleich a producer of handpainted toy figurines and accessories, was founded here by Friedrich Schleich in 1935 and run as a family-owned business until the end of 2006.

Twin towns – sister cities

Schwäbisch Gmünd is twinned with:
 Barnsley, United Kingdom (1971)
 Antibes, France (1976)
 Bethlehem, United States (1991)
 Székesfehérvár, Hungary (1991)
 Faenza, Italy (2001)

Notable people

Public service 

Heinrich Parler (c. 1310 – c. 1370), architect and sculptor
Peter Parler (1332/33–1399), architect and sculptor, son of Heinrich
Veit Warbeck (c. 1490–1534), scientist and diplomat
August Franz Josef Karl Mayer (1787–1865), physician, anatomist and physiologist
Robert von Ostertag (1864–1940), veterinarian
Emil Molt (1876–1936), businessman, social reformer and anthroposophist
Hermann Weller (1878–1956), indiologist and neo-Latin poet
Alfred Haag (1904–1982), politician
Lina Haag (1907–2012), anti-Fascist activist
Theodor Schwenk (1910–1986), anthroposophist, engineer and pioneering water researcher
Karl Ramsayer (1911–1982), geodesist
Albert Bürger (1913–1996), Luftwaffe officer and fireman
Hartmut Esslinger (born 1944), industrial designer
Norbert Barthle (born 1952), politician
Michael Braungart (born 1958), chemist
Richard Arnold (born 1959), politician

The Arts 
Hans Judenkönig (c. 1450–1526), lutenist
Jerg Ratgeb (c. 1480–1526), painter
Hans Baldung (1484/85–1545), painter
Jakob Woller (c. 1510–1564), sculptor
Emanuel Leutze (1816–1868), history painter
Johannes Scherr (1817–1886), novelist and literary critic
Hermann Pleuer (1863–1911), Impressionist and landscape artist
Aron Strobel (born 1958), lead guitarist for Münchener Freiheit

Sport 
Uwe Messerschmidt (born 1962), track cyclist and road bicycle racer
Simon Tischer (born 1982), volleyball player
Andreas Hofmann (born 1986), footballer
Daniel Hägele (born 1989), footballer
Julian Grupp (born 1991), footballer
Carina Vogt (born 1992), ski jumper, gold medallist at the 2014 Winter Olympics

References

External links

 
Schwäbisch Gmünd Live Webcam
Schwäbisch Gmünd — The oldest Staufertown 
Schwäbisch Gmünd portal, links, image gallery, artists 
Wikisource (German) - some hundred of PD texts

1802 disestablishments
States and territories established in 1268
Towns in Baden-Württemberg
Ostalbkreis
Württemberg